DreamBIG Children's Festival, formerly Come Out Festival or Come Out Children's Festival, is a large biennial arts festival for schools and families held in South Australia. 

It began as the Come Out Festival in 1974 as part of the Adelaide Festival of Arts and became a stand-alone biennial event in 1975. The first biennial event was held at the Adelaide Festival Centre, and it has been produced by the Centre since 2015. The festival's name was changed from "Come Out" in 2017, when the organisers decided the term was no longer appropriate due to its meaning for the LGBTI community. More than 2 million children have participated in the Festival since 1974.

History

Artists & Companies 
Artists and companies who have presented work at the Festival include:

 Australian Dance Theatre
 Black Violin
 Boori Monty Pryor
 Carclew
 Circus Monoxide
 Cirkidz
 Compagnia TPO
 D'Faces of Youth Arts
 Jumbuck Theatre
 Kevin Lock
 Slingsby
 Snuff Puppets
 State Theatre Company of South Australia
 Theatre Australia
 The Pinjarra Project
 Weeping Spoon Productions

References

Further reading
DreamBIG: History
DreamBIG Children's Festival (2019)
Come Out Children’s Festival: 22 – 30 May 2015
Out Children’s Festival 2015 (South Australian Museum)

Festivals established in 1974
Arts festivals in Australia
Festivals in Adelaide
1974 establishments in Australia